= Suz12 polycomb repressive complex 2 subunit pseudogene 1 =

Pseudogene in the species Homo sapiens

SUZ12P1

Identifiers
- Aliases: SUZ12P1, SUZ12P, SUZ12 polycomb repressive complex 2 subunit pseudogene 1, SUZ12 pseudogene 1
- External IDs: GeneCards: SUZ12P1; OMA:SUZ12P1 - orthologs
Orthologs
Species	Human	Mouse
Entrez	440423	n/a
Ensembl	ENSG00000264538	n/a
UniProt	n a	n/a
RefSeq (mRNA)	n/a	n/a
RefSeq (protein)	n/a	n/a
Location (UCSC)	n/a	n/a
PubMed search		n/a
- Wikidata
View/Edit Human

SUZ12 polycomb repressive complex 2 subunit pseudogene 1 is a pseudogene.
